John Harry Scolinos (March 28, 1918 – November 7, 2009) was an American football and baseball coach. He was the head baseball coach at Pepperdine University from 1946 to 1960 and at California State Polytechnic University Pomona from 1962 to 1991, compiling career college baseball record of 1,070–954–13.  Scolinos was also the head football coach at Pepperdine from 1955 to 1959, tallying a mark of 17–26–1.

Scolinos was born in Los Angeles. He died at age 91 in November 2009.

Coaching career
Scolinos totaled 1,198 victories. While coaching Cal Poly Pomona, he won NCAA Division II national championships in 1976, 1980 and 1983, along with six California Collegiate Athletic Association championships and was named Division II coach of the year three times.

He was inducted into the American Association of Collegiate Baseball Coaches Hall of Fame in 1974.

Olympics
Scolinos was the pitching coach for the 1984 U.S. Olympic Baseball team which finished second behind Japan, losing 6–3 in the final game.

Head coaching record

Football

References

External links
 

1918 births
2009 deaths
Baseball first basemen
Anaheim Aces players
Cal Poly Pomona Broncos baseball coaches
Corpus Christi Spudders players
Osceola Indians players
Merced Bears players
Palestine Pals players
Pepperdine Waves baseball coaches
Pepperdine Waves football coaches
Riverside Reds players
St. Joseph Angels players
Topeka Owls players
Sportspeople from Los Angeles
Baseball players from Los Angeles
Baseball coaches from California
Coaches of American football from California
National College Baseball Hall of Fame inductees